Clinton Hill South Historic District is a national historic district in Clinton Hill, Brooklyn, in New York City.  It consists of 246 largely residential contributing buildings built between the 1850s and 1922.  It includes fine examples of Neo-Grec style row houses.  Also in the district are a number of early 20th century apartment buildings in the Colonial Revival style.

It was listed on the National Register of Historic Places in 1986.

Notable residents 
 Thomas F. Woodlock, 155-157 Lefferts Place, editor of The Wall Street Journal and Interstate Commerce Commission commissioner.
 James William Elwell, 70 Lefferts Place, shipping merchant and philanthropist; members of the New York Chamber of Commerce.

See also
 Clinton Hill Historic District

References

Colonial Revival architecture in New York City
Clinton Hill, Brooklyn
Historic districts on the National Register of Historic Places in Brooklyn